Pacolli is a surname. Notable people with the surname include:

Behgjet Pacolli (born 1951), Kosovo politician and businessman
Selim Pacolli (born 1969), Kosovo politician